This is a list of rivers in Liberia. This list is arranged  by drainage basin, with respective tributaries indented under each larger stream's name.

Atlantic Ocean
Moa River (Sierra Leone)
Magowi River
Mano River (Gbeya River)
Moro River
Mafa River
Lofa River
Mahe River
Lawa River
Saint Paul River
Nianda River
Via River

Mesurado River
Junk River
Du River
Farmington River
Saint John River
Mani River
Timbo River
Cestos River
Gwen Creek
Nuon River
Sehnkwehn River
Sinoe River
Dugbe River
Dubo River
Grand Cess River
Cavalla River (Cavally River)
Dube River (Douobe River)

References

Rand McNally, The New International Atlas, 1993.
 GEOnet Names Server
United Nations, Department for Peacekeeping Operations Cartographic Section, 2010 

Liberia
Rivers